With God on our side may also refer to:

 With God On Our Side (film) (2010), a documentary about Christian Zionism
 "God on Our Side", title of Episode 25 of Revelations – The Initial Journey (2002)
"With God on Our Side" (song), a song by Bob Dylan on his 1964 album The Times They Are A-Changin'''
 With God on Our Side: One Man's War Against an Evangelical Coup in America's Military, a 2006 book by Michael Weinstein

 See also 
 Gott mit uns'', the German phrase.
 In God We Trust